Dalea mollis is a species of flowering plant in the legume family which is known by the common name hairy prairie clover.

Distribution
This wildflower is native to the deserts of California, Arizona, and Northwestern Mexico.

It is a common member of the Mojave Desert and Sonoran Desert ecoregions. It forms a small, flat patches on the gravelly desert floor and on slopes and weedy roadsides.

Description 
Dalea mollis is a small cloverlike mat-forming annual legume with gland-dotted foliage covered thickly in long white hairs. The leaves are made up of several pairs of small, folded, oval-shaped leaflets each about a centimeter long. The plant flowers in pea-like blooms just under a centimeter wide which may be lavender, yellow, or white, sometimes bicolored. The fruit is a small, single-seeded legume pod.

External links
Jepson Manual Treatment
USDA Plants Profile
Photo gallery

mollis
Flora of Northwestern Mexico
Flora of the Southwestern United States
Flora of the California desert regions
Flora of the Sonoran Deserts
Natural history of the Colorado Desert
Natural history of the Mojave Desert
Taxa named by George Bentham
Plants described in 1848
Flora without expected TNC conservation status